Angaria nodosa is a species of sea snail, a marine gastropod mollusk in the family Angariidae.

Description

Distribution

References

External links

Angariidae
Gastropods described in 1842